The Manor Studio (a.k.a. The Manor) was a recording studio in the manor house at the village of Shipton-on-Cherwell in Oxfordshire, England, north of the city of Oxford.

Overview
The Manor and its outbuildings are listed Grade II on the National Heritage List for England.

The Manor was the third residential recording studio in the United Kingdom. The first being Ascot Sound Studios built between 1970 and 1971 by John Lennon in an addition to his Tittenhurst Park mansion, where he recorded his Imagine album. The second being Rockfield Studios in Monmouthshire. The concept was pioneered in 1969 by French musician Michel Magne in the Château d'Hérouville.

The manor house was owned by Richard Branson and used as a recording studio for Virgin Records, although artists signed to other labels also used the studios. Tom Newman and Simon Heyworth assisted in its construction and worked on various albums at the studio.

The first officially released album to be recorded there, while the studio was still being given its finishing touches in late 1971, was Let's Make Up And Be Friendly, a farewell reunion album by members of the Bonzo Dog Band. The most famous album to be recorded there was perhaps Tubular Bells by Mike Oldfield, during 1972–73 when Oldfield was given a week to record an LP at the studio. Vivian Stanshall, formerly of the Bonzo Dog Band, was recording his own first solo album there immediately afterwards, which led to his guest role as Master of Ceremonies on Tubular Bells. Sandy Denny also began her second solo album Sandy there in March 1972.

In April 1995, after the takeover of Virgin Records by EMI, The Manor Studio was closed as a recording studio by EMI. It is now the country home of the Marquess of Headfort.

In 2010, NME reported that the Manor was up for sale for £5.75 million.

Studio facilities

The facilities were advertised as follows, as of 1973:

16/8/4 track studio
60 minutes from London
100 acre grounds
Resident engineers
Resident cooks
Room for producers, musician's partners, roadies
Day and Night recording
Free food and beds
Good rates etc

16 Track Ampex
20 Channel desk
Equalization
Dolby noise reduction
Quadrophonic monitoring
Phasing facilities
Echo facilities: tapes/plates/springs/drums
Grand piano
Room for 40 musicians etc

Partial list of albums recorded at The Manor

 Let's Make Up and Be Friendly (1971–72) – The Bonzo Dog Band – the first band to use the studio, in November 1971
 Rock On (December 1971) – The Bunch featuring Sandy Denny, Richard Thompson, Trevor Lucas and others.
 Sandy (1972) – Sandy Denny
 Trouble at Mill (March 1972) – King Earl Boogie Band
 Two Weeks Last Summer (April 1972) – Dave Cousins 
 The Academy in Peril (1972) – John Cale
 Mekanïk Destruktïw Kommandöh (1972–73) – Magma
 Flying Teapot (1972–73) – Gong
 Tubular Bells (September 1972 – March 1973) – Mike Oldfield
 Men Opening Umbrellas Ahead (1973) – Vivian Stanshall
 Double Diamond (1973) – If
 Legend (May 1973) – Henry Cow
 Castle in Spain (June 1973) – CCC Inc.
 Faust IV (June 1973) – Faust
 Spring Suite (July 1973) – McKendree Spring
 October (1973) – Claire Hamill
 Phaedra (December 1973) – Tangerine Dream
 Dandruff (1974) – Ivor Cutler
 You (1974) – Gong
 Unrest (February–March 1974) – Henry Cow
 Blame It on the Night (1974) – Kevin Coyne
 Ghosts (July–September 1974) – Strawbs
 Slapp Happy (1974) – Slapp Happy
 Desperate Straights (1975) – Slapp Happy/Henry Cow
 In Praise of Learning (1975) – Henry Cow/Slapp Happy
 Fine Old Tom (1975) – Tom Newman
 Local Lads Make Good (1975) – Supercharge
 Rubycon (1975) – Tangerine Dream
 Ricochet (1975) – Tangerine Dream
 Deep Cuts (spring–summer 1976) – Strawbs
 Bloodletting (1976) – Boxer
 A Day at the Races (1976) – Queen – backing tracks
 A Period of Transition (1976) – Van Morrison
 White Music (October 1977) – XTC
 Wavelength (1978) – Van Morrison
 Manorisms (1978) – Wet Willie
 Gene Simmons (April 1978) – Gene Simmons
 Una donna per amico (1978) - Lucio Battisti
 Frenzy (November–December 1978) – Split Enz
 Metal Box (March 1979, two tracks) – Public Image Ltd
 Present Tense (July–August 1979) – Shoes
 Metro Music (August 1979) – Martha and the Muffins
 Black Sea (July 1980) – XTC
 The Flowers of Romance (October 1980) – Public Image Ltd
 Strada facendo (1980–81) – Claudio Baglioni
 The Nature of the Beast (1981) – April Wine
 La Folie (July–September 1981) – The Stranglers
 English Settlement (October–November 1981) – XTC
 All Fall Down (March 1982) – The Sound
 Mummer (September–December 1982) – XTC
 The Crossing (1983) – Big Country
 Head First (January–March 1983) – Uriah Heep
 Born Again (mid-1983) – Black Sabbath
 All the Rage – General Public
 The Swing (1984) – INXS
 Concert: The Cure Live (1984) – The Cure 
 La vita è adesso (1985) – Claudio Baglioni
 Power Windows (1985) – Rush
 Peace (Summer 1986) – The Cult
 Gone to Earth (September 1986) – David Sylvian
 Wild in the Streets (1987) – Helix
 Hold Your Fire (1987) – Rush
 The Mission (Autumn 1987) – The Mission UK
 All About Eve (Summer 1987) – All About Eve
 Once Around the World (1987) – It Bites
 Thunder and Consolation (1988) – New Model Army
 Trash the Planet (1989) – Spy vs Spy
 Wish (September 1991 – February 1992) – The Cure
 The Ethereal Mirror (1993) – Cathedral
 Gold Against the Soul (1993) – Manic Street Preachers
 Wild Wood (1993) – Paul Weller
 Grand Prix (September–October 1994) – Teenage Fanclub
 Carnival of Light (1994) – Ride
 No Need to Argue (1994) – The Cranberries
 The Bends (1995) – Radiohead
 Stanley Road (1995) – Paul Weller
 All Change (1995) – Cast – the last band to record at the studio

References

External links
Maps.google.co.uk

1971 establishments in England
1995 disestablishments in England
Cherwell District
Culture in Oxfordshire
Country houses in Oxfordshire
Grade II listed houses
Grade II listed buildings in Oxfordshire
Recording studios in England
Former recording studios